Surf, Drags & Rock 'n' Roll is the sixth album released by surf music band The Surfin' Lungs, released in 2006 on the Spanish label Wild Punk Records and featuring another new line-up, with Sputnik Weazel replacing Ray Webb in the drumseat. Apart from being a soloist in his own right, Sputnik also previously played in a band called The X-ocettes. All 13 tracks were written by the group who had moved to a new label, Spain's Wild Punk Records. Recorded in Brighton, the album had a grittier edge to it than their previous release, although the subject matter remained the same, with punk meeting surf head on. Vocal duties were shared around, with Clive Gilling headlining two songs, while new member Sputnik Weazel grabbing the spotlight on "She Can't Dance".

Track listing 
 Grounded For The Summer (Dean, Pearce, Gilling, Weazel) – Lead vocals: Chris Pearce
 Honolulu High (Dean, Pearce, Gilling, Weazel) – Lead vocals: Clive Gilling
 I Wanna Winnebago (Dean, Pearce, Gilling, Weazel) – Lead vocals: Chris Pearce
 She Doesn't Understand Me (Dean, Pearce, Gilling, Weazel) – Lead vocals: Chris Pearce
 Open Channel D (Dean, Pearce, Gilling, Weazel) – Instrumental
 Surf, Drags & Rock 'n' Roll (Dean, Pearce, Gilling, Weazel) – Lead vocals: Clive Gilling
 Holy Guacamole (Dean, Pearce, Gilling, Weazel) – Lead vocals: Chris Pearce
 Honest John (Dean, Pearce, Gilling, Weazel) – Lead vocals: Chris Pearce
 Been Awake All Night (Dean, Pearce, Gilling, Weazel) – Lead vocals: Chris Pearce
 She Can't Dance (Dean, Pearce, Gilling, Weazel) – Lead vocals: Sputnik Weazel
 Little Tiki Wagon (Dean, Pearce, Gilling, Weazel) – Lead vocals: Chris Pearce
 Do You Wanna Drive To The Beach (Dean, Pearce, Gilling, Weazel) – Lead vocals: Chris Pearce
 Psycho Surfer (Dean, Pearce, Gilling, Weazel) – Lead vocals: Chris Pearce

Personnel 
 Chris Pearce – vocals, guitar, Hawaiian guitar, acoustic guitar, piano, organ
 Steve Dean – vocals, bass
 Clive Gilling – vocals, guitar, keyboards
 Sputnik Weazel – drums, vocals, percussion, piano

Producer 
 The Surfin' Lungs

Trivia 
 Holy Guacamole" was a rehash of "Hully Gully" by The Olympics.

2006 albums
The Surfin' Lungs albums